High Tech Academy (commonly known as High Tech or HTA), is a post-secondary school serving grades 10-12, and is located in downtown Cleveland, Ohio, United States.

High Tech is an option school established by the Cleveland Metropolitan School District (CMSD) and Cuyahoga Community College (Tri-C). High Tech prepares high school students for technological careers and/or higher education. The programs develop the student's academic and technical skills particularly in English, reading comprehension, mathematics and information technology. Participating students attend their home high school in the morning and are transported in the afternoon for college courses at Tri-C's Metropolitan Campus in Cleveland until 2:00pm (students may take classes pass the school hours).

High Tech graduates are prepared for immediate employment, continuation at Tri-C, or transfer to four-year institution of higher education. 

In the fall of 2009 Tri-C and CMSD opened another program similar to High Tech; High Achievement Academy open to 11 and 12 grade students at Whitney Young. These students will take their classes at Tri-C's Eastern Campus.

Cleveland Metropolitan School District, PNC Bank (formerly, National City Bank) and Cuyahoga Community College are sponsors of High Tech Academy.

Background
High Tech Academy (HTA) is a dual enrollment program in which high school students in the Cleveland Metropolitan School District and Warrensville Heights High School attend a half day of school at their home school and then attend classes on the Tri-C campuses.

Much of the college tuition costs are paid through a state-supported plan entitled Post Secondary Enrollment Options, which allows college level classes to also count toward students’ graduation requirements in high school.
 
The program focuses on computer technology, business and academic core courses. The Cleveland District provides a principal, and the College provides a program manager and together they coordinate programming for 200-300 high school students annually.

There are some entry requirements for the program and all students apply through the guidance counselors at their home high school.

In some cases, students can earn an associate's degree at the same time they are earning a high school diploma.

Students may apply to HTA in the spring term of their freshman or sophomore year.

John Hay, Whitney Young and James Ford Rhodes are the leading schools in HTA.  The majority of HTA's 2009-2010 enrollment comes from these three schools.

Requirements
 Maintain attendance (98%-100%)
 Maintain academic standards (3.0 or higher GPA)
 Maintain a high standard of conduct
 Attend six Student Success Workshops or Career Seminars each year
 Complete fifteen hours of community service each year
 Submit a completed Application packet, which includes an essay and two letters of recommendation
 College English and mathematics assessments
 An interview with the student and parent
 All seniors attend all High Tech Academy graduation activities during their senior year in addition to their high school's graduation ceremonies.

Extracurricular activities
High Tech offers
 Key Club
 Vocabulary Builders
 Boys Basketball (via Cleveland Metropolitan School District)
 Girls Basketball (via Cleveland Metropolitan School District)
 Ladies First

Participating High Schools
Cleveland School of the Arts
John Adams
John F. Kennedy
John Hay
Carl F. Shuler
Collinwood
East
East Technical
Garrett Morgan
Ginn Academy
Glenville
James Ford Rhodes
John Marshall
Lincoln West
Martin Luther King, Jr.
South
Whitney M. Young
Mc2 stem High School

References

Education in Cleveland
High schools in Cuyahoga County, Ohio
Public high schools in Ohio
Cleveland Metropolitan School District